Vĩnh Nghiêm Pagoda (literally Ever Solemn) is a pagoda in an area of  at 339, Nam Kỳ Khởi Nghĩa street, Ward 7, District 3 Ho Chi Minh City. This is the first pagoda in Vietnam to be built in Vietnamese traditional architecture style but with concrete. The highest structure in this pagoda is the 7-story,  tower. This pagoda houses and worship of one buddha and two bodhisattvas: Gautama Buddha, Manjusri, Samantabhadra.

History 
In 1964, two monks Thích Tâm Giác and Thích Thanh Kiểm originally from the North came South Vietnam from North Vietnam to spread Buddhism started the construction of Vinh Nghiem Pagoda. The model and namesake of the pagoda was the 11th century Vinh Nghiem Buddhist temple in Đức La Village, Trí Yên Commune, Yên Dũng District, Bắc Giang Province, which dates the reign of Lý Thái Tổ during the Lý dynasty. The village was once a major center of Buddhist teaching and the Trúc Lâm sect of Vietnamese Buddhism.

External links 
 Official website of Vĩnh Nghiêm Pagoda
 A TV report on Vĩnh Nghiêm Pagoda
 Relocation of Vĩnh Nghiêm Pagoda gate (Vietnam Net)
 Photo Gallery- SaiGonTiepThi News
 Comment of Vinh Nghiem Pagoda architecture by Nguyễn Đức Long
 Vĩnh Nghiêm on TuoiTre news (Vietnamese only)

Buddhist temples in Vietnam
Buddhist temples in Ho Chi Minh City
Pagodas in Vietnam